In heraldry, azure is the tincture with the colour blue, and belongs to the class of tinctures called "colours". In engraving, it is sometimes depicted as a region of horizontal lines or else is marked with either az. or b. as an abbreviation.
The term azure shares origin with the Spanish word "azul", which refers to the same color, deriving from hispanic Arabic lazawárd  the name of the deep blue stone now called lapis lazuli. The word was adopted into Old French by the 12th century, after which the word passed into use in the blazon of coats of arms.

As an heraldic colour, the word azure means "blue", and reflects the name for the colour in the language of the French-speaking Anglo-Norman nobles following the Norman Conquest of England. A wide range of colour values is used in the depiction of azure in armory and flags, and in common usage it is often referred to simply as 'blue'.

In addition to the standard blue tincture called azure, there is a lighter blue sometimes found that is called bleu celeste or "sky blue". Neither azure nor bleu celeste is precisely defined as a particular shade of blue, but azure is consistently depicted in a much darker shade.

Sometimes, the different tinctures are said to be connected with special meanings or virtues, and represent certain elements and precious stones. Even if this is an idea mostly disregarded by serious heraldists throughout the centuries, it may be of anecdotal interest to see what they are, since the information is often asked for. Many sources give different meanings, but azure is often said to represent the following:

 Of jewels, the sapphire
 Of heavenly bodies, Jupiter (the planet Jupiter is further associated with the metal tin in traditional alchemical/occultistic lore)

Gallery

See also

Bleu celeste

References

Colours (heraldry)
Shades of blue